"There's a Lull in My Life" is a 1937 song, written by Mack Gordon and Harry Revel for the film Wake Up and Live. A "torch ballad", it was released in 1937 as a single and became Alice Faye's only major hit record. Other popular versions in 1937 were by Teddy Wilson (vocal by Helen Ward), George Hall and His Orchestra, and by Duke Ellington (vocal by Ivie Anderson).

It has also been performed by Nat King Cole, Natalie Cole, Ella Fitzgerald, Chet Baker, Kurt Hohenberger, Johnny Hartman, Anita O'Day, Kay Starr and Tony Bennett.

References

1937 songs
1930s jazz standards
Songs with lyrics by Mack Gordon
Songs with music by Harry Revel